The Public Orator is a traditional official post at universities, especially in the United Kingdom. The person in this position acts as the voice of the university during public occasions.

The position at Oxford University dates from 1564. The Public Orator at the University presents honorary degrees, giving an oration for each person that is honoured. They may be required to compose addresses and letters as directed by the Hebdomadal Council of the University. Speeches when members of the royal family are present may also be required. The post was instituted for a visit to Oxford by Queen Elizabeth I in 1566. The Public Orator, Thomas Kingsmill, gave a very long historical speech. Sir Isaac Wake addressed King James I similarly in 1605.

At the University of Cambridge, the title for the position changed from "Public Orator" to "Orator" in 1926. Trinity College Dublin in Ireland also has a Public Orator. There is no equivalent position in American universities.

List of Public Orators

England

Oxford University
See also :Category:Public Orators of the University of Oxford.

 Edmund Campion
 William Crowe
 William Strode (lived 1602–1644)
 Henry Hammond (1645–1648)
 Ralph Button (1648–1660)
 Thomas Kingsmill
 Isaac Wake
 William Walter Merry (1880–1910)
 A.D. Godley (1910–1920)
 Arthur Blackburne Poynton (1925–1932)
 Cyril Bailey (1932–1939)
 Thomas Farrant Higham (1939–1958)
 A.N. Bryan-Brown (1958–1967)
 Colin Hardie (1967–1973)
 John G. Griffith (1973–1980)
 Godfrey Bond (1980–1992)
 Jasper Griffin (1992–2004)
 Prof. Richard Henry Austen Jenkyns (2004–2016)
 Jonathan Katz (2016 to present)

Cambridge University
See also :Category:Cambridge University Orators.

 Richard Croke (1522)
 George Day (1528–1537)
 John Redman (1537–1538)
 Sir Thomas Smith (1538–1542)
 Sir John Cheke (1544)
 Roger Ascham (1546–1554)
 Thomas Gardiner (1554–1557)
 John Stokes (1557–1559)
 George Ackworth (1559–1560)
 Anthony Girlington (1560–1561)
 William Masters (1563–1565)
 Thomas Byng (1565–1570)
 William Lewin (1570–1571)
 John Becon (1571–1573)
 Richard Bridgewater (1573–1581)
 Anthony Wingfield (1580–1589)
 Henry Mowtlow (1589–1594)
 Sir Robert Naunton (1594–1611)
 Sir Francis Nethersole (1611–1619)
 George Herbert (1619–1627)
 Robert Creighton (1627–1639)
 Henry Molle (1639–1650)
 Ralph Widdrington (1650–1673)
 Henry Paman (1674–1681)
 John Billers (1681–1688)
 Henry Felton (1689–1696)
 William Ayloffe (1696–1726)
 Edmund Castle (1727–1730)
 Philip Williams (1730–1741)
 James Tunstall (1741–1746)
 Philip Yonge (1746–1752)
 John Skynner (1752–1762)
 William Barford (1762–1768)
 Richard Beadon (1768–1778)
 William Pearce (1778–1788)
 William Lort Mansel (1788–1798)
 Edmund Outram (1798–1809)
 Ralph Tatham (1809–1836)
 Christopher Wordsworth (February–April 1836)
 William Henry Bateson (1848–1857)
 William George Clark (1857–1869)
 Sir Richard Claverhouse Jebb (1869–1875)
 Sir John Edwin Sandys (1875–1920; orator emeritus from 1920)
 Terrot Reaveley Glover (1920–1939)
 William Keith Chambers Guthrie (1939–1957)
 Lancelot Patrick Wilkinson (1958–1974)
 Frank Henry Stubbings (1974–1982)
 James Diggle (1982–1993)
 Anthony Bowen (1993–2007)
 Rupert Thompson (2008 to present)

Liverpool University
 John Pinsent, (1983 to 1987)

Durham University
 Sir Ian Richmond, (1949 to 1951)

Birkbeck, University of London
 Steven Connor, (2001 to 2012)
 Joanna Bourke, (2012 to present)

Ireland

Trinity College, Dublin

 Thomas Ebenezer Webb (1879 to 1887)
 Arthur Palmer (1888no later than 1897)
 Sir Robert Tate, (1914 to 1952)
 John V. Luce, (1972 to 2005)
 Brian McGing, (2005 to 2008)
 Anna Chahoud, (2008 to present)

See also
 Public speaking

References

 
Public speaking
Academic terminology
Academia in the United Kingdom
Terminology of the University of Oxford
Terminology of the University of Cambridge